Tum or TUM can refer to:

Education 
 Technical University of Munich
 TUM Institute for Advanced Study
 TUM Asia
 Technological University (Mandalay)
 The University of Manila

Places 
 Tum, Poland; a village
Tum Collegiate Church
 Tum, Ethiopia; a village in the Maji District near Tum Airport
 Tum Airport (IATA airport code TUJ, ICAO airport code HAMJ), Maji Woreda, Ethiopia
 Tumut Airport, IATA airport code "TUM"
 Tumbes Region, Peru, ISO 3166-2 code PE-TUM, shortened to TUM
 Tuen Mun station, Hong Kong; MTR station code TUM

People
 Tecla Tum, Kenyan politician
 Stephanie Tum (born 1987), Cameroonian actress
 Tum Saray (born 1992), Cambodian soccer player
 Rigoberta Menchú Tum, (born 1959), an indigenous Guatemalan and 1992 Nobel Peace Prize laureate
 Mehmet Tüm (born 1957), Turkish politician
 Hervé Tum (born 1979), Cameroonian soccer player
 Gerard Tum (1040–1120), founder of the Order of St John of Jerusalem (the Knights Hospitaller)

Other uses 
 The human stomach or abdomen
 Totally Unimodular Matrix, in mathematics
 Tumbuka language (ISO 639-2 and 639-3 language code tum)
 Tum, aka Toum, a variety of the Phong language cluster
 Tum: A Dangerous Obsession, 2004 Hindi film
 Tum: My Pledge of Love, 2011 Philippine film
 Truck Utility Medium, British Army designation for the long wheelbase variant of the Land Rover Wolf

See also 

 Atum, an Egyptian god
 Tums (disambiguation)
 Tumtum (disambiguation), including tum tum